Lar Göran Carlson (born 30 August 1936 in Gothenburg) is a Swedish actor and film director.

Selected filmography
1962 - Raggargänget
1964 - Vi på Saltkråkan (TV)
1966 - Heja Roland!
1967 - Rooftree
1971 - Den byxlöse äventyraren (director)
1979 - Father to Be
1981 - Tuppen
1989 - Förhöret
2001 - Sprängaren

References

External links

Swedish film directors
Swedish male actors
1936 births
Living people
People from Gothenburg